The David Aghmashenebeli National Defence Academy also known commonly as the ETA is the main military institution for the educational training of senior officers in the Defence Forces of Georgia. It is a legal entity under the Ministry of Defence of Georgia. It is a LEPL (leading higher military Institution), which aims to indoctrinate officers with some of the highest academic and military education standards. The current rector of the ETA is Brigadier General Malkhaz Makaradze.

History
The Georgian military educations dates back to 1862 when the first military school was established in Tbilisi. On the occasion of Georgia obtaining its independence in 1918, the Commanders-in-Chief of the Democratic Republic of Georgia, Major General Giorgi Kvinitadze established the Georgian Junkers Military School". After the Red Army invasion of Georgia in early 1921, the school ceased to exist. During Bolshevik and Georgian Communist Party rule, the school was transformed into an institution of Red Army students, later being was renamed to the Tbilisi Higher Artillery Command School, which was abolished in 1992 upon the restoration of independence. On 28 May 1993 based on the order of Defence Minister Giorgi Karkarashvili, the United Military Academy of the Republic of Georgia was created. It began operating on 1 September 1993. On 20 February 2003 the Academy was given the honorific prefix of "David Aghmashenebeli" (David IV of Georgia in English. Six years later, it changed its location to Gori, where it still operates today.  In late 2010, the ETA underwent a new process for reforms, which included the NCEQE Council for the authorization of the ETA's status as the highest educational institution. The following year, it received support from the Georgia–Georgia National Guard Partnership.

Student life
The length of studies at the ETA had been defined for 4 years. In 2005, due to the need of the growth of the personnel strength of the Georgian Armed Forces" the system of the Academy has been transformed to retain only the 18-month-long officer training courses. Upon entry into the academy, cadets sign a contract with the MoD for 10 years of military service, of which 4 years are dedicated to studies and 6 years of which is consequent military service. Cadets receive the rank of Lieutenant upon graduation. The students at the Academy were called "Listeners", which in 2014 was changed to "Junkers" in order to honour the original Junkers who died in service to the Democratic Republic of Georgia. The Academic Council is a governing body of NDA, with its authority being defined under the law "Regarding Higher Education". The tasks of the council include presenting the ETA and to create and approve internal legislation.

Since 2018, the ETA hosted a summer school known as "My World", with the support of the support of the Embassy of the United States, Tbilisi.

Structure
Currently, the departments are operating at the ETA:

Leadership personnel
Rector
Deputy Rector
Deputy Rector
Head of Administration
Quality Assurance Service
Internal Audit Service
International Relations Diviisn
Educational Service
Bachelor School
Command and General Staff College
Junior Officer School
Language Training School
Examination Center
Liberary
Psychological Service Section
Scientific Research Center
Training Battalion
Army Service Section
Finance Management Division
Procurement Section
HR Management Section
Public Relations Section
Chancellory
Legal Division
Material and Technical Support Section
Logistical Support Section
Signals and Indormatuin Technology Section
Medical Center
Sports Complex

In September 2015, the ETA graduated its first class of baccalaureate school cadets.

Notable alumni
Giorgi Matiashvili, the incumbent Chief of Georgian Defence Forces.

See also
War College of the Azerbaijani Armed Forces
Vazgen Sargsyan Military University

References

External links
Official Website

Educational institutions established in 1993
Military education and training in Georgia (country)
1993 establishments in Georgia (country)